"No Surprise" is a song by Canadian hard rock group Theory of a Deadman. It was released in February 2005 as the lead single off their second album, Gasoline.

Content
The song is about a girl who always runs off with guys besides her boyfriend. He says, "It ain't no surprise that bitch is leaving me."

Music video
The video is about a girl waking up and finding a note that says "I'm leaving" from her boyfriend. She goes to trash his apartment, and in the end, she finds another note which says "be back with coffee love you." At this point he walks in and sees what she has done. The video then ends.

The video has been compared to Kelly Clarkson's "Since U Been Gone". This came as a surprise to the band, as they found it quite humorous and said the similarities were not intentional.

Chart positions

References

Theory of a Deadman songs
2005 singles
604 Records singles
Song recordings produced by Howard Benson
Songs written by Tyler Connolly